Aberdeen is a census-designated place (CDP) in Center Township, Porter County, in the U.S. state of Indiana. The community centers on The Course at Aberdeen, a golf course. The population of the CDP was 1,875 at the 2010 census.

Geography

Demographics

References

External links
The Course at Aberdeen

Census-designated places in Porter County, Indiana
Census-designated places in Indiana